Daniel Bigeault (born 1960), better known as Dee Nasty, is a French DJ, producer, and rapper. He is one of Radio Nova's original DJs, and is best known for producing France's first hip hop record.

Career 
Dee Nasty began his DJing career back in 1981 after discovering Hip-Hop back in 1979. By 1985, he was already forming a formidable reputation both promoting and producing hip hop music. By 1987 he became internationally recognized at the DMC World DJ Championships. He was also DMC Champion of France from 1986 to 1988. He followed up with becoming the European DMC Champion in 1990. He has continued to work in the French Hip-Hop scene featuring prominently on many releases.

Discography 
 "Panam City Rappin" (1984)
 "Scienz of Life" (1999)
 "Nastyness" (2001)
 "Underground Forever" (2004)

Featuring 
 "Planète Mars" IAM (track "Keep On Scratching"), 1993
 "Fighting Spirit" Manu le Malin (track "Mutation"), 2002
 "TR-303" Triptik (track "Hip Hop"), 2003
 "Future School" AMS Crew (multiple tracks), 2005

References

1960 births
French rappers
Living people
French hip hop record producers